Wilber Sánchez (born 21 December 1968) is a Cuban former wrestler who competed in the 1992 Summer Olympics and in the 1996 Summer Olympics.

References

1968 births
Living people
Olympic wrestlers of Cuba
Wrestlers at the 1992 Summer Olympics
Wrestlers at the 1996 Summer Olympics
Cuban male sport wrestlers
Olympic bronze medalists for Cuba
Olympic medalists in wrestling
Medalists at the 1992 Summer Olympics
Pan American Games medalists in wrestling
Pan American Games bronze medalists for Cuba
Wrestlers at the 1995 Pan American Games
Medalists at the 1995 Pan American Games
20th-century Cuban people
21st-century Cuban people